Schwarzau im Gebirge is a village in the district of Neunkirchen in the Austrian state of Lower Austria.

Population

References

External links 
 Pictures of Schwarzau

Cities and towns in Neunkirchen District, Austria
Rax-Schneeberg Group